William Hendren (1832 - 3 January 1903) was a member of the Queensland Legislative Assembly.

Biography
Hendren was born in Armagh, Ireland, the son of Samuel Hendren and his wife Ann (née McCulloch). After arriving in Australia he worked as a storekeeper and Auctioneer.

In 1854 he married Annie Jenkins and together had three sons and three daughters. Jensen died at Liverpool, New South Wales in January 1903.

Public career
Hendren won the seat of Bundamba at the 1878 Queensland colonial election He resigned from the parliament two years later.

References

Members of the Queensland Legislative Assembly
1832 births
1903 deaths
19th-century Australian politicians